Resident Alien may refer to:

Resident alien, a non-citizen living in a country
Resident Alien (album), a 1995 album by Spacehog
Resident Alien (comics), a 2012 comic book series by Peter Hogan and Steve Parkhouse
Resident Alien (TV series), a 2021 TV series based on the comic book series
Resident Alien (film), a 1990 documentary film

See also
Resident Aliens, a 1989 book by Stanley Hauerwas and William Willimon